The Gummfluh is a mountain in the western Bernese Alps, located on the border between the Swiss cantons of Vaud and Berne. It is the highest peak in the chain of mountains on the south side of the Pays d'Enhaut and it lies approximately halfway between Château d'Oex and Gstaad. The northern slopes form part of the large nature reserve of La Pierreuse.

References

External links 
Gummfluh on Hikr.org
Gummfluh hiking guide

Bernese Alps
Mountains of the Alps
Mountains of Switzerland
Mountains of the canton of Vaud
Mountains of the canton of Bern
Bern–Vaud border
Two-thousanders of Switzerland